Ursula Biemann (born 8 September 1955) is a Swiss video artist, curator, educator, and art theorist.

Biography 
Born on 8 September 1955 in Küsnacht. Biemann trained in art in Boston, Mexico and New York, graduating with a Bachelor of Fine Arts at the School of Visual Arts (SVA) in 1986. 

From 1995 to 1998 she curated the Shedhalle Zürich; and from 2000 to 2003, she taught at the École Supérieure des Beaux-Arts, Genève.

Biemann's video art at first addressed the topics of gender, globalization and mobility in an essayistic and documentary-like style. Her later work focuses on resources, the ecology and the climate, and uses a more critical style involving mythical elements. Her works were first noted in the international media art scene before a first exhibition in Switzerland in 2009. Her works have been exhibited internationally since 1998, and are held by several Fonds d'art contemporain in France and Switzerland, as well as by the Centre national d'art et de culture Georges Pompidou in Rennes, the Musée d'Art du Valais in Sion, and the Generali Foundation in Vienna. She received the 2009 Prix Meret Oppenheim among other awards.

Biemann's writing addresses topics such as mobility, migration, feminism, the ecology and the Anthropocene, including the ancient trans-Saharan trade routes that are now being used by migrants.

References

Living people
1955 births
Swiss video artists
Swiss curators
Swiss women curators
20th-century Swiss women artists
21st-century Swiss women artists
People from Küsnacht
Academic staff of the École Supérieure des Beaux-Arts, Genève